Greenville Historic District in Greenville, Georgia is a  historic district which was listed on the National Register of Historic Places in 1990.  The listing included 209 contributing buildings and 103 non-contributing buildings, two contributing structures, and two contributing sites.

It includes the Burwell O. Hill House and the Meriwether County Courthouse, which are both listed separately on the National Register.

It is bounded by Gresham, Gaston, Woodbury, Talbotton, Baldwin, Bottom, Martin, Terrell, LaGrange, and Newnan St.

References

Historic districts on the National Register of Historic Places in Georgia (U.S. state)
National Register of Historic Places in Meriwether County, Georgia
Georgian architecture in Georgia (U.S. state)
Victorian architecture in Georgia (U.S. state)
Buildings and structures completed in 1828